Barzin is a Canadian singer-songwriter known for his slow and melancholic songs. Barzin has released four albums in his career.

Career

A project that began sometime in 1995, Barzin was a solo endeavor at its inception, the work of Barzin Hosseini. Somewhere along the way, however, Barzin shed its solitary skin and introduced a wide array of characters into its sound. From amongst a rotating cast of musicians, who occasionally made appearances on recordings and at performances, three individuals slowly became a fixture of this project. The three characters in question are Mike Findlay, Suzanne Hancock, and Tony Dekker of Great Lake Swimmers. With the addition of these musicians the sound of the music has continued to remain true to the aesthetics of quietness and minimalism. It still concerns itself with exploring the quiet side of pop.

In 2003, Barzin released its self-titled debut album through the Montreal-based label, Where Are My Records. The following year an E.P. titled Songs for Hinah, was released through the French-based label, Hinah.  and in Europe through Monotreme Records, described by Allmusic as "a lush, lovely, and ultimately monochromatic effort".

Barzin's third album, Notes to an Absent Lover, was released in 2009, The Independent stating "its ambient textures feel rich enough to luxuriate in, evoking the suspended animation of big sadness with exquisite poise".

In 2013 Barzin released his 4th album entitled "To Live Alone In That Long Summer." The Album was released by Monotreme Records and Ghost Records. It received favourable reviews in  publications such as Rolling Stones, New York Times, USA Today.

The band has drawn comparisons to Low, Red House Painters, and Sparklehorse.

Discography

Studio albums
My Life in Rooms, 2006
Notes to an Absent Lover, 2009
To Live Alone in That Long Summer, 2014
Voyeurs in the Dark, 2022

EPs
Barzin, 2000
Songs for Hinah, 2004
Just More Drugs, 2006
Look What Love Has Turned Us Into, 2009
Moonpalace, 2014

References

External links
Barzin (Official Site)
Barzin (USA Today)
Barzin (Rolling Stone)

Canadian singer-songwriters
Canadian people of Iranian descent
Living people
Year of birth missing (living people)
Canadian musicians of Iranian descent
Canadian male singers
Canadian male singer-songwriters